Wigston Birkett House Community Special School is a special school with academy status based in Wigston, Leicestershire, England. The school caters for up to 200 students aged between 5 and 19 with a range of additional learning needs.

Facilities
The school is spread over four sites located to the south of Leicester:

 Station Road site: Located in Wigston, on the site of Wigston Academy. This new building, which includes a swimming pool, multi-sensory environments, outdoor play areas and accessible classrooms was opened in September 2017. It replaced a previous building located at Launceston Road, Wigston. This site caters for students with moderate, severe, profound and complex needs aged between 5 and 19.
 Thistly Meadow Site: Located at Thistly Meadow Primary School in Blaby. Caters for KS2 students with moderate and severe needs.
 The Birkett House Centre at Thomas Estley: Located at Thomas Estley Community College in Broughton Astley. Caters for KS3 students with moderate and severe needs.
 Birkett House Seniors: Located at Countesthorpe Academy in Countesthorpe. Caters for KS4 and post-16 students with moderate and severe needs. Students at this site have access to a nearby allotment and it hosts a student run café known as "Fox Lodge".

Reputation
Birkett House was rated as "Outstanding" in all areas during its most recent Ofsted inspections in 2015 and 2019.

References

External links
Official Website
Fox Lodge café

Special schools in Leicestershire
Academies in Leicestershire